Waidacher is a surname. Notable people with the surname include:

Isabel Waidacher (born 1994), Swiss ice hockey player, sister of Monika and Nina
Monika Waidacher (born 1990), Swiss ice hockey player
Nina Waidacher (born 1992), Swiss ice hockey player